Robert Keith Orton Sr. (July 21, 1929 – July 16, 2006) was an American professional wrestler.

The patriarch of the Orton wrestling family, his two sons Bob Orton Jr. and Barry Orton, and grandson Randy Orton, have all wrestled professionally. To distinguish between him and his son, he is also known as Bob Orton Sr. Bob Orton Sr. was often referred to by his nickname "The Big O".

Career 

Orton was a two-time holder of the Florida version of the NWA World Tag Team Championship with tag team partner Eddie Graham in 1966. He also innovated the pedigree as he captured several other titles in various National Wrestling Alliance's (NWA) territories with it, including the Florida and Georgia versions of the NWA Southern Heavyweight Championship, as well as the NWA Florida Tag Team Championship (with Bob Orton Jr.) in Florida Championship Wrestling and the NWA United States Heavyweight Championship in Central States Wrestling. He also competed in the American Wrestling Association (AWA), where he would also gain championship success. In 1961, Orton competed for the then NWA Capitol Wrestling Federation (now WWE) teaming with "Nature Boy" Buddy Rogers.

Orton eventually left Capitol Wrestling Corporation, by competing in other NWA territories. In 1968, Orton returned to Capitol Wrestling Corporation renamed as World Wide Wrestling Federation (WWWF), often using the ring name Rocky Fitzpatrick. In September 1968, as "Cowboy" Rocky Fitzpatrick, he was number one challenger to WWWF World Heavyweight Champion Bruno Sammartino, losing to Sammartino at Madison Square Garden. He fought Sammartino in other northeastern cities as well. In the summer of 1969, Orton wrestled in the Ohio Sports Classics Promotion. He retired in July 2000 and spent the last years of his life living in Las Vegas, Nevada.

Personal life 
Orton married his wife Rita on January 22, 1950. Together they had three children: Bob Jr., Barry, and Rhonda. Bob Jr.'s son, Randy Orton, is also a professional wrestler.

Orton and André the Giant were good friends for many years.

Death 
Orton died in Las Vegas, Nevada on July 16, 2006, at the age of 76, five days short of his 77th birthday, following multiple heart attacks. His grandson stated "He had a heart attack at home, and they took him to the hospital where he had another more severe heart attack, he had an eight hour surgery that gave him a 20 percent chance to survive; he did, but about 10 hours after the surgery he passed away." He was cremated and had his ashes scattered on Mount Charleston, Nevada in April 2007.

Championships and accomplishments 
 American Wrestling Association
 AWA Midwest Heavyweight Championship (2 times)
 AWA Midwest Tag Team Championship (3 times) – with Mike DiBiase (1) and Maurice Vachon (2)
 Nebraska Heavyweight Championship (1 time)
 Cauliflower Alley Club
 Family Award (2005) – with Barry Orton and Bob Orton Jr.
 Central States Wrestling
 NWA Central States Heavyweight Championship (2 times)
 NWA North American Tag Team Championship (Central States version) (1 time) – with Buddy Austin
 NWA United States Heavyweight Championship (Central States version) (1 time)
 Championship Wrestling from Florida
 NWA Florida Tag Team Championship (3 times) – with Dennis Hall (1), Hiro Matsuda (1), and Bob Orton Jr. (1)
 NWA Southern Heavyweight Championship (Florida version) (6 times)
 NWA World Tag Team Championship (Florida version) (2 times) – with Eddie Graham
 Mid-South Sports
 NWA Southern Heavyweight Championship (Georgia version) (1 time)
 NWA Big Time Wrestling
 NWA Texas Tag Team Championship (1 time) – with Lord Alfred Hayes
 NWA Western States Sports
 NWA Southwest Heavyweight Championship (1 time)
 NWA Missouri Heavyweight Championship (1 time)
St. Louis Wrestling Hall of Fame
Class of 2019
 Worldwide Wrestling Associates
 WWA International Television Tag Team Championship (2 times) – with Wild Red Berry

References

External links
 

1929 births
2006 deaths
American male professional wrestlers
Professional wrestlers from Kansas
Sportspeople from Kansas City, Kansas
Stampede Wrestling alumni
20th-century professional wrestlers
NWA Florida Tag Team Champions
NWA Southern Heavyweight Champions (Florida version)
NWA World Tag Team Champions (Florida version)